Dragon Ball Z: Budokai 2, released as  in Japan, is a fighting video game developed by Dimps based upon the anime and manga series, Dragon Ball Z, it is a sequel to Dragon Ball Z: Budokai for the PlayStation 2 release in 2003 and GameCube release in 2004. It was published in Japan and Europe by Bandai and in North America and Australia by Atari SA.

Gameplay
The World Tournament allows players to compete against up to 8 players in a Martial Arts Tournament. If more than one human player is present no prize money is available, but with only one human player prizes can be won. Dueling mode allows a player to fight the computer at a preset skill level, or two human players to fight each other using any custom skills. A player may also watch a fight between two computer fighters.

Made up of three sections, the Skill Shop, character editing, and instructions. A player may edit skills on either memory card. Aside from Dragon World, the Skill Shop is the place to get your skill capsules. Bulma will wear a different costume depending on how many the player has collected in Dragon World.

Each character has a Health bar, and a Ki bar. When the health runs out, the character loses (as in most fighting games). Ki is required to perform special moves, and Ki blasts. Characters can dodge attacks. There are varying mechanics for ultimate moves, some will automatically work upon their execution, some require a button input within a certain timeframe, some require rotating the control stick to build power, and some require both players to rotate control sticks in a struggle.

Development and release
In Japan, 2,000 V-Jump readers were able to get Dragon Ball Z2V, a revamped version of the game.

Soundtrack

Reception

In Japan, Dragon Ball Z 2 sold 584,183 copies. In the United States, Budokai 2 sold  copies and was the fourth top video game rental of 2004. The game sold a total of  copies in Japan and the United States.

Both version have an aggregate score of 66/100 on Metacritic. GameSpot, who gave the game a 6.7/10 commented that "The improved visuals are nice, and some of the additions made to the fighting system are fun, but Budokai 2 still comes out as an underwhelming sequel."

Notes

References

External links
 

2003 video games
3D fighting games
Atari games
Dimps games
Dragon Ball Z: Budokai
GameCube games
Multiplayer and single-player video games
PlayStation 2 games
Video games with cel-shaded animation
Video games scored by Kenji Yamamoto (composer, born 1958)